Professor Power (Anthony Power) is a fictional character appearing in American comic books published by Marvel Comics.

Publication history

His first appearance was in Marvel Team-Up vol. 1 #117, although individuals working for him appear before then.

Fictional character biography
Anthony Power was born in the town of Norfolk, Virginia.  He was originally a historian and teacher, and an advisor to the President of the United States of America. He has a son Matthew, who fought in the Vietnam War only to be discharged after Matthew had a nervous breakdown due to the violence he witnessed in combat.

A right-wing conservative, Power believed that the only way that world peace could be obtained would be if America conquered the world. But knowing that US government would never agree to such a strategy, Power decided that he would have to conquer the United States in order to bring about his world view.

Adopting the name "Professor Power", the head of a subversive organization and the leader of an unnamed army of right-wing extremists. Power, working behind the scenes, assembled a group of telepaths which was used by his ally Morgan MacNeil Hardy to restructure American society, until Hardy was foiled by Captain America. August Masters, also working on behalf of Power, was revealed as the head of a secret project involving telepaths. Masters' men, posing as federal agents, captured Richmond. Masters attempted to launch this psionic attack against the U.S.S.R., but battled Captain America, Daredevil, and the Defenders.

Professor Power used robots to test the capabilities of Spider-Man and Wolverine. Aided by the Fixer, Power captured Professor X and attempted to add his mental powers to Mentallo's. He then revealed to Xavier that his son had slipped into a catatonic state (due to his father's refusal to get his son psychological help) and that he had paid Mentallo to use his boosted power to forcibly restore his son to consciousness.  In the ensuing psychic battle though, Matthew was hit with a stray psychic blast, which permanently destroyed his shattered mind.

Driven insane with rage, Powers ordered his mind transferred into his son's body (permanently erasing any remaining traces of his son's consciousness) and sought revenge against Xavier by plotting the murder of his students. Encased in a battle-suit, he battled Spider-Man and the Beast.

As Number One, Professor Power was also the founder of the third Secret Empire. He sent Harridan, Seraph, and Cloud to abduct the Vision, but was foiled by the Defenders. He sent Mad Dog and Mutant Force to disrupt the wedding of Daimon Hellstrom and Patsy Walker, and they battled the Defenders. Professor Power had double agents in the New York S.H.I.E.L.D. headquarters free Leviathan, Mad Dog, and Mutant Force from S.H.I.E.L.D. custody, and sent Leviathan against the Defenders. Power was then revealed as a member of the Secret Empire, and sent Mandroids to recapture the escaped Cloud. Power captured the Defenders, and unsuccessfully attempted to brainwash them into killing the New Mutants in revenge against Professor X. Power launched a subliminal mind-control satellite in an attempt to start World War III. The satellite was destroyed, and his consciousness was telepathically merged with his son's by Moondragon, resulting in catatonic madness.

Some time later, Power was abducted from S.H.I.E.L.D. custody and brought back to his castle in the Adirondack Mountains in New York State, and revived by his followers. Power by this point was starting to exhibit signs of his own mental breakdown, as life wearing his son's face took its toll on him emotionally. Sadly, in combat with  Captain America (John Walker), Powers was brutally beaten to death.

Power's corpse was again stolen by his followers, who resurrected him by way of converting his battle suit into a life-support system.  Professor Power has since continued fighting heroes, including Darkhawk, Iron Man, X-Men, and X-Factor.

Civil War
Professor Power is a self-confessed loser at the wake of Stilt-Man, who had been killed by the Punisher. Power, along with rest of the villains at the wake, was poisoned by the Punisher, who disguised as a bartender poisoned their drinks and blew up the bar. Powers survived the attack, thanks to EMTs arriving and pumping his stomach of said poison.

Nomad: Girl Without A World
Professor Power resurfaced in disguise as a high school teacher at the school which Rikki Barnes of Counter-Earth has been attending under the alias of Rikki Baines, performing mind-control experiments on the student body.

Powers and abilities
Professor Power was originally a normal human with a gifted intellect. He is an excellent long-range planner, and battle strategist, and has degrees in history and political science.

His scientists designed for him a battle suit of full body armor capable of flight via jet engines attached to it, and an electron-beam (fired from his right forefinger).

When Professor Power was in Matthew Power's body, he possessed superhuman strength.

References

External links

Comics characters introduced in 1982
Fictional characters from Virginia
Marvel Comics supervillains